Oleg Rayko (born 8 June 1945) is a Soviet middle-distance runner. He competed in the men's 1500 metres at the 1968 Summer Olympics.

References

1945 births
Living people
Athletes (track and field) at the 1968 Summer Olympics
Soviet male middle-distance runners
Olympic athletes of the Soviet Union
Place of birth missing (living people)